The Monumental Lighthouse of La Serena (Faro Monumental de La Serena) is a Chilean lighthouse located at the Avenida del Mar of La Serena. The structure is one of the most representative of the city and one of the most popular tourist attractions in the area.

Construction
It was built between 1950 and 1951 at the request of President Gabriel González Videla during the development of his Plan Serena. The construction was designed by Ramiro Pérez Arce and directed by University of Chile civil engineer Jorge Tanks Larenas. In April 1953 it was officially handed over to the authorities, led by mayor Ernesto Aguirre Valín, the provincial mayor Roberto Flores Alvarez and president González Videla. On October 24, 1953, the structure was inaugurated by mayor Juan Cortés Alcayaga of the Municipality of La Serena, the lighting system was removed afterwards, leaving it as notable point of reference in later charts and publications. On November 7, 1985, the then Commander in Chief of the Navy, Admiral José Toribio Merino presented the lighthouse as a tourist attraction for the city to the then mayor Eugenio Rodríguez Munizaga. The May 12, 1986, the Chilean Navy officially handed the Lighthouse to the Municipality, taking charge of its maintenance. On June 9, 2010, the building was registered on the National Heritage List.

See also

 List of lighthouses and lightvessels in Chile
 List of National Monuments of Chile

References

Lighthouses in Chile
Lighthouses completed in 1950
Spanish Colonial Revival architecture in Chile